The Flood at Saint-Cloud is an oil painting by French artist Paul Huet, which was first exhibited at the Exposition Universelle of 1855 in Paris. It is now kept in the Musée du Louvre, in Paris.

References

Paintings by Paul Huet
1855 paintings
Paintings in the Louvre by French artists
French paintings
Horses in art